The County of Yarrol is a county (a cadastral division) in Queensland, Australia, located in the Wide Bay–Burnett region to the west of Bundaberg. On 7 March 1901, the Governor issued a proclamation legally dividing Queensland into counties under the Land Act 1897. Its schedule described Yarrol thus:

Parishes
Yarrol is divided into parishes, as listed below:

References

External links 

 

Yarrol